Manuel Abraham Bromberg (March 6, 1917 – February 3, 2022) was an American artist and Professor Emeritus of Art, at the State University of New York at New Paltz. He was a 1946 Guggenheim Fellow.

Life
Bromberg was born in Centerville, Iowa, to David Bromberg, an immigrant from Germany, and Tonata Sobul, an immigrant from Poland. At the age of 16, Bromberg was chosen the winner of the prestigious George Bellows Award, a national art competition among high school students. First prize was a year's scholarship to the Pratt Institute in New York City, but he opted instead to accept a full scholarship to the Cleveland School of Art. He studied at the Colorado Springs Fine Arts Center, with Boardman Robinson and Henry Varnum Poor, from 1932 to 1940.

Bromberg completed three murals for the New Deal's Section of Fine Arts: Greybull, Wyoming, Tahlequah, Oklahoma, and Geneva, Illinois.
Bromberg married Jane Dow in Woodstock, New York, in December 1941.

In 1943, at the age of 26, Bromberg was appointed by George Biddle, chairman of the War Department Art Advisory Board, as an official war artist. Bromberg was assigned to serve with the European Theater of Operations (England, France and Germany) and landed on Omaha Beach in June 1944. While in France, Bromberg met Pablo Picasso, Jean Cocteau, and Georges Braque.

In 1944, he was awarded the Legion of Merit.

Bromberg taught at Salem College, North Carolina State University College of Design, from 1949 to 1954, where he collaborated with Buckminster Fuller and others to form Skybreak Carolina Corp. In 1953, Bromberg was commissioned to create a mural for the student union building of NCSU.

In the 1960s, while Professor of Painting at the State University of New York at New Paltz, Bromberg created a series of monumentally-scaled castings of cliff faces. One of Bromberg's cliff sculptures appears in the permanent collection of Storm King Art Center.
  
Bromberg lived in Woodstock, New York. He turned 100 in March 2017, and died on February 3, 2022, at the age of 104.

References

External links
Guide to the Photograph of Manuel Bromberg 1965
http://arts.guardian.co.uk/pictures/0,8542,1217134,00.html
http://library.brown.edu/cds/askb/artists_index.html
http://rwebs.net/avhistory/wwiiart.htm

1917 births
2022 deaths
20th-century American painters
21st-century American painters
American centenarians
American male painters
United States Army personnel of World War II
American muralists
American war artists
American people of German descent
American people of Polish descent
Section of Painting and Sculpture artists
North Carolina State University faculty
Painters from Iowa
People from Centerville, Iowa
Recipients of the Legion of Merit
Salem College faculty
State University of New York at New Paltz faculty
World War II artists
United States Army non-commissioned officers
Men centenarians
20th-century American male artists